Paint Creek is an unincorporated community in southeast Haskell County, Texas, United States, in north central Texas.

History
Paint Creek is named after the nearby stream, which Stamford Dam impounds 8 miles to the east of the community to form Lake Stamford. In 2011, press reports indicated Haskell County had a population of 5,899, down from about 14,000 in 1950.

It is the hometown of 14th United States Secretary of Energy, former Governor of Texas and two time U.S. presidential candidate Rick Perry, who served as Texas's 47th governor and the longest-serving governor in Texas history.

The Paint Creek Independent School District serves area students.

Logistical data

Demographics
As of the 2009 American Community Survey (ACS), 324 people resided in the area, with 608 housing units in the area. The racial makeup of the county was 95.9% White, with 4.1% from two or more races. About 6.2% of the population were Hispanic or Latino of any race.
 
In the county, the population distributed as 12.3% under the age of 20, 5.70% from 18 to 24, 1.2% from 20 to 24, 3.0% from 25 to 34, 18.0% from 35 to 44, and 12.4% from 45 to 54, 5.6% from 55 to 59, 20.1% from 60 to 64, 28.10% who were 65 years of age or older. The median age was 56.9 years.

References

External links

 
Paint Creek, TX information at ProximityZone.com
Paint Creek, TX info at hometownlocator.com

Rick Perry
Unincorporated communities in Texas
Unincorporated communities in Haskell County, Texas